Eastern district is a district of Plovdiv, southern Bulgaria. It has 60,535 inhabitants. The stadium of PFC Botev Plovdiv and the beer factory of Kamenitza are located in the district. The infamous neighbourhoods of Stolipinovo and Izgrev are also situated there.

References 

Neighbourhoods in Plovdiv